Chamaemyia sylvatica is a species of fly in the family Chamaemyiidae. It is found in Europe and the Near East with records from the British Isles, the Netherlands, Poland, Switzerland, Bulgaria, and (Asian) Turkey.

References

Chamaemyiidae
Diptera of Asia
Insects of Turkey
Muscomorph flies of Europe
Insects described in 1966
Taxa named by James Edward Collin